Bryan Wood (born 3 April 1954) is a former Australian rules football player who played in the Victorian Football League (VFL) between 1972 and 1982 for the Richmond Football Club and between 1983 and 1986 for the Essendon Football Club.

References
Hogan P: The Tigers Of Old, Richmond FC, Melbourne 1996
Richmond Football Club – Hall of Fame

Living people
Richmond Football Club players
Richmond Football Club Premiership players
Essendon Football Club players
Essendon Football Club Premiership players
Australian rules footballers from Victoria (Australia)
1954 births
People educated at Melbourne High School
Four-time VFL/AFL Premiership players